Comoros competed at the 2010 Summer Youth Olympics in Singapore, from 14 to 26 August 2010. This marked the first time Comoros has competed at the Summer Youth Olympics.

The Comoros team consisted of 4 athletes competing in 3 sports: athletics, judo and swimming.

Athletics

Boys
Track and Road Events

Girls
Track and Road Events

Judo

Individual

Team

Swimming

References

External links
Competitors List: Comoros

Nations at the 2010 Summer Youth Olympics
2010
Youth Olympics